Smajlović is a Serbo-Croatian surname. Notable people with the surname include:

Ljiljana Smajlović (born 1956), Serbian journalist
Meliha Smajlović (born 1993), Bosnian-Turkish volleyball player
Mišo Smajlović (born 1938), Bosnian football manager and a former player

Bosnian surnames
Serbian surnames
Slavic-language surnames
Patronymic surnames
Surnames from given names